Habar is a sub-district located in Arhab District, Sana'a Governorate, Yemen. Habar had a population of 1111 according to the 2004 census.

References 

Sub-districts in Arhab District